Sergey Eduardovich Politevich or Siarhey Eduardavich Palitsevich (born 9 April 1990) is a Belarusian professional football player currently playing for Dinamo Minsk.

Career

Club

On 10 July 2018, FC Kairat announced the signing of Politevich.

International
Politevich was part of the Belarus U21 team that finished in 3rd place at the 2011 UEFA European Under-21 Football Championship. Politevich missed only one game at the finals due to yellow card accumulation.
He was a member of the Belarus Olympic side that participated in the 2012 Toulon Tournament as well as the 2012 Olympic tournament in London, where he played in all three first-round matches. Politevich made his debut for the senior national side of his country on 21 May 2014, in the 5:1 win against Liechtenstein in a friendly match.

Honours
Shakhtyor Soligorsk
Belarusian Premier League champion: 2020, 2021, 2022

Career statistics

International goals

References

External links

1990 births
Living people
People from Lida
Sportspeople from Grodno Region
Belarusian footballers
Belarusian expatriate footballers
Association football defenders
Olympic footballers of Belarus
Footballers at the 2012 Summer Olympics
Belarus international footballers
Belarusian Premier League players
Süper Lig players
Kazakhstan Premier League players
FC Naftan Novopolotsk players
PFC Krylia Sovetov Samara players
FC Dinamo Minsk players
Gençlerbirliği S.K. footballers
FC Kairat players
FC Shakhtyor Soligorsk players
Belarusian expatriate sportspeople in Russia
Belarusian expatriate sportspeople in Turkey
Belarusian expatriate sportspeople in Kazakhstan
Expatriate footballers in Russia
Expatriate footballers in Turkey
Expatriate footballers in Kazakhstan